(1838–1902) was a Japanese samurai of the Edo period, and served as a senior retainer of the Sendai domain. Kagenori was the thirteenth Katakura Kojūrō. Kagenori moved with his father and a group of the Katakura clan retainers to Hokkaidō. His father was Katakura Kuninori and his mother was Aihime, Date Munehira's daughter. His son was Katakura Kagemitsu.

External links
Katakura family tree (in Japanese)
Short biographical notes on Katakura Kuninori (in Japanese)

Meiji Restoration
Samurai
1838 births
1902 deaths
Karō
Katakura clan